Kibungo was a south-eastern province of Rwanda known for its production of bananas. In 2006, it became part of the new Eastern Province.

Kibungo Municipality is also a municipality within the province. 

Districts and municipalities:
 District of Rusumo
 District of Rukira 
 District of Nyarubuye
 District of Mirenge 
 Municipality of Kibungo
 District of  Kigarama
 Municipality of Rwamagana
 District of  Muhazi
 District of Kayonza
 District of Cyarubare

Former provinces of Rwanda

States and territories disestablished in 2006